Delaware's 3rd Senate district is one of 21 districts in the Delaware Senate. It has been represented by Democrat Elizabeth Lockman since 2018, succeeding fellow Democrat Robert Marshall.

Geography
District 3 is based in downtown Wilmington, also covering some unincorporated areas to the south.

Like all districts in the state, the 3rd Senate district is located entirely within Delaware's at-large congressional district. It overlaps with the 2nd, 3rd, 4th, and 13th districts of the Delaware House of Representatives. At 5 square miles, it is the smallest Senate district in the state.

Recent election results
Delaware Senators are elected to staggered four-year terms. Under normal circumstances, the 3rd district holds elections in midterm years, except immediately after redistricting, when all seats are up for election regardless of usual cycle.

2018

2014

2012

Federal and statewide results in District 3

References 

3
New Castle County, Delaware